A number of ships have been named SS Delphic, including –
  – an ocean liner launched in 1897 and sunk in 1917
  – a freighter launched in 1918 as War Icarus, renamed Mesabain 1919, Delphic in 1925 and Clan Farquhar in 1933. She was broken up in 1948

Ship names